Jeevanadi is a 1996 Indian Kannada-language drama film directed by D. Rajendra Babu and produced by P. Dhanraj. The film stars Vishnuvardhan, Anant Nag and Kushboo. The film was widely popular for its title song composed by Koti upon release.

Plot 
This movie indirectly depicts how River Kaveri takes birth in one place and serves, loved and accepted by another place.

Cast 
 Vishnuvardhan as Sagar
 Anant Nag as Dr. Harshavardhan
 Kushboo as Kaveri 
 Urvashi as Dr. Priyadarshini
 Tara 
 Umashree as Santhanamma
 Srinivasa Murthy as Subhramanya
 R. N. Jayagopal 
 Doddanna as Ravi Shankar Shastri 
 Shivaram as Dr. Shivaram 
 Bank Janardhan
 Kishori Ballal as Annapurna

Soundtrack

The music of the film was composed by Koti and lyrics written by R. N. Jayagopal. The album consists of eight soundtracks. The song "Kannada Naadina Jeevanadhi" was received extremely well and became very popular. Another track "Yello Yaaro Hego" from the film was Sonu Nigam's first song in Kannada as a playback singer.

References

External links 
 No Song of 'Jeevanadhi' at Centenary

1996 films
1990s Kannada-language films
Indian drama films
Films scored by Koti
Films directed by D. Rajendra Babu
1996 drama films